Chama is a surname of Zambian origin that may refer to:

Adrian Chama (born 1989), Zambian footballer
Albert Chama, Zambian Anglican bishop
Bronson Chama (born 1986), Zambian footballer
Clatous Chama (born 1991), Zambian footballer
Davies Chama (born 1964), Zambian politician
Dick Chama (1946–2006), Zambian footballer and coach
Enock Chama, Zambian boxer
Noel Chama (born 1997), Mexican racewalking athlete

Zambian surnames